Narendra Kalyan Patel (born 30 November 1986) is a Kenyan cricketer. He made his List A cricket debut in the 2015 ICC World Cricket League Division Two tournament for Kenya against Namibia on 17 January 2015. In November 2018, he was named in Kenya's squad for the 2018 ICC World Cricket League Division Three tournament in Oman, as a replacement for Collins Obuya.

References

External links
 

1986 births
Living people
Kenyan cricketers
Place of birth missing (living people)